This page shows the results of the Bowling Competition for men and women at the 1999 Pan American Games, held from July 23 to August 8, 1999 in Winnipeg, Manitoba, Canada. The event was included for the fourth time at the Pan American Games.

Having been held at the Games as a demonstration sport in 1983, the sport was given full status by the Pan American Sports Organization Council in 1986.

Men's competition

Singles

Team

Women's competition

Singles

Team

Medal table

References
 Sports 123
 bowlingdigital

1999
Events at the 1999 Pan American Games
1999 in bowling